Barylaus is a genus of beetles in the family Carabidae, containing the following species:

 Barylaus estriata (Darlington, 1939)
 Barylaus puncticeps (Darlington, 1939)

References

Pterostichinae